Netball was first played in Sri Lanka in 1921. The first game was played by Ceylon Girl Guide Company at Kandy High School. The first interschool march was played between Kandy High School and C.M.S. Ladies' College, Colombo in February 1925. In 1927, netball was played at Government Training College for the first time.  This helped spread the game around Sri Lanka.

History
The game was being played at Methodist College Colombo and Bishop's College by the 1930s. By 1952, Sri Lankan clubs were playing Indian club sides. In 1956, Sri Lanka played its first international match against Australia's national team in Sri Lanka. In 1972, the Netball Federation of Sri Lanka was created. In 1983, Netball Federation of Sri Lanka was dissolved by the government.

England's record against Ceylon in international matched between 1949 and 1976 was one win.

Sri Lanka took part in the 1960 netball meeting of Commonwealth countries to try to standardize the rules for the game. This meeting took place in Sri Lanka.

Sri Lanka had a national team compete in the fifth Asian Netball Championships held in Colombo, Sri Lanka in 2001.

Sri Lanka competed in the 7th Asian Youth Netball Championship held in 2010 in India.

As of August 2016, the women's national team was ranked number twenty-seven in the world.

Some of the top performances for the Sri Lanka netball team include:
 1967 Donald Windsor Challenge Shield: First 
 1985 Asian Netball Tournament: Second 
 1990 Asian Netball Tournament: First 
 1997 Asian Netball Tournament: First 
 2001 Asian Netball Tournament: First 
 2009 Asian Netball Tournament: First 
 2010 Asian Youth Netball Championship: Second
 2012 Asian Netball Tournament: Second
 2013 Asian Youth Netball Championship: Third
 2018 Asian Netball Tournament: First
 2022 Asian Netball Tournament: First

The table below contains a list of all the presidents and secretaries of the Netball Federation of Sri Lanka.

2013 March - 2014 March
MsVictoria Lakshimi
Ms Shyama Coora

References

Bibliography

External links 
Olympic Council of Asia